Metaxaglaea is a genus of moths of the family Noctuidae.

Species
 Metaxaglaea australis Schweitzer, 1979
 Metaxaglaea inulta (Grote, 1874)
 Metaxaglaea semitaria Franclemont, 1968
 Metaxaglaea viatica (Grote, 1874)
 Metaxaglaea violacea Schweitzer, 1979

References
Natural History Museum Lepidoptera genus database
Metaxaglaea at funet

Cuculliinae